Ronald Campbell Macfie (1867–1931) was a Scottish medical doctor, poet and science writer specialising in eugenics and evolution.

Biography

He was a Scottish physician and writer. He had qualified in medicine in Aberdeen in 1897 and specialised in the treatment of tuberculosis.

He was also a Liberal Member of British Parliament mentioned in The Bookman Treasury of Living Poets (4th edition 1931) as a contributor to such works as Fairy Tales for Old and Young (1909), and The Golden Treasury of Scottish Poetry (1940). Among his works are "Man’s Record in the Rocks" (My Magazine, May 1921)  The Art of Keeping Well Cassell & Co. 1918/The Vegetarian Society and Evolutionary Consequences of War (cited below).

Campbell Macfie suggested that male war deaths (during World War I) would create a surplus of fertile women, thus reducing the overall birthrate whilst the surviving men would select partners from a wide range of 'surplus' females according to eugenically (sexually) attractive characteristics. He averred that:

Books published

The Romance of Medicine (1907)
Air and Health (1909)
Science, Matter, and Immortality (1909)
The Titanic: (An Ode of Immortality) (1912)
Heredity, Evolution, and Vitalism (1912)
The Romance of the Human Body (1919)
Sunshine and Health (1927)
The Faiths and Heresies of a Poet and Scientist (1932)
The Theology of Evolution (1933)

See also

Lady Margaret Sackville
Baby Boom
Flora Thompson

References

1867 births
1931 deaths
19th-century Scottish medical doctors
20th-century Scottish medical doctors
Non-Darwinian evolution
Panpsychism
Scottish science writers
Vitalists